Sunshine, Arkansas may refer to:

Sunshine, Ashley County, Arkansas
Sunshine, Garland County, Arkansas